"Catholic School Girls Rule" is a song from the 1985 album Freaky Styley by The Red Hot Chili Peppers. Although never released as a proper radio single, a music video for the song was made and was directed by longtime friend, Dick Rude. The video was only played on Playboy TV because of a nude scene, and because it also featured a controversial scene of Kiedis singing from on a cross. The song was also featured on the band's 1992 compilation album, What Hits!? and the music video can be found on the VHS/DVD of the same name.

Background
The song is inspired by an instance where a 14-year-old girl who attended a local Catholic school met singer Anthony Kiedis backstage, who slept with her while on tour before and after discovering her age. The song's chorus features a guitar riff identical to that of the song "Thirsty and Miserable" by Black Flag.

Live performances  
"Catholic School Girls Rule" was performed regularly on the Freaky Styley Tour. Following that tour, it was not performed until a one-off performance on the Blood Sugar Sex Magik Tour. The song was not performed again until the Stadium Arcadium World Tour. It has not been performed since then, but it was teased in 2016 on The Getaway World Tour.

References

Notes

Red Hot Chili Peppers songs
1985 singles
Songs written by Anthony Kiedis
Songs written by Flea (musician)
1985 songs
Songs written by Cliff Martinez
Music video controversies
Songs written by Jack Sherman (guitarist)